Lawrence Robert Topp (11 November 1923 – 8 January 2017) was an English footballer who represented Great Britain at the 1952 Summer Olympics and 1956 Summer Olympics. Topp played as an amateur for Hendon, and represented the England amateur national team.  He made his debut for Hendon (then known as Golders Green) in 1944 and remained a regular in the side until his retirement at the end of the 1960–61 season. He won three Athenian league titles with the club (1953, 1956 and 1961) and scored in the final of the 1960 FA Amateur Cup when Hendon beat Kingstonian 2–1 at Wembley.

References

1923 births
2017 deaths
English footballers
Footballers at the 1952 Summer Olympics
Footballers at the 1956 Summer Olympics
Hendon F.C. players
Olympic footballers of Great Britain
Footballers from St Pancras, London
England amateur international footballers
Association footballers not categorized by position